Roberta Silva Ratzke  (born 28 April 1990) is a Brazilian female volleyball player.  She is part of the Brazil women's national volleyball team. She competed at the 2020 Summer Olympics, in the Women's tournament, winning a silver medal.

Career 
With her club Rio de Janeiro she competed at the FIVB Volleyball Women's Club World Championship in  2013, 2015 and 2016. She competed at the 2018 Women's Volleyball Nations League, and 2019 Women's Volleyball Nations League.

Awards

Individuals
 2008 U20 South American Championship – "Best Setter"
 2017 South American Club Championship – "Best Setter"
 2017 Montreux Volley Masters – "Best Setter"
 2017–18 Brazilian Superliga – "Best Setter"

Clubs
 2010–11 Brazilian Superliga –  Champion, with Rexona-Ades
 2012–13 Brazilian Superliga –  Champion, with Unilever Vôlei
 2013–14 Brazilian Superliga –  Champion, with Rexona-Ades
 2014–15 Brazilian Superliga –  Champion, with Rexona-Ades
 2015–16 Brazilian Superliga –  Champion, with Rexona-Ades
 2016–17 Brazilian Superliga –  Champion, with Rexona-SESC
 2013 South American Club Championship –  Champion, with Unilever Vôlei
 2015 South American Club Championship –  Champion, with Rexona-Ades
 2016 South American Club Championship –  Champion, with Rexona-Ades
 2017 South American Club Championship –  Champion, with Rexona-SESC
 2018 South American Club Championship –  Runner-up, with SESC Rio
 2013 FIVB Club World Championship –  Runner-up, with Rexona-Ades
 2017 FIVB Club World Championship –  Runner-up, with Rexona-SESC

References

1990 births
Living people
Brazilian women's volleyball players
Place of birth missing (living people)
Universiade medalists in volleyball
Setters (volleyball)
Universiade gold medalists for Brazil
Medalists at the 2011 Summer Universiade
Medalists at the 2013 Summer Universiade
Volleyball players at the 2020 Summer Olympics
Olympic volleyball players of Brazil
Medalists at the 2020 Summer Olympics
Olympic medalists in volleyball
Olympic silver medalists for Brazil
Sportspeople from Curitiba
21st-century Brazilian women